Arthur John Shawcross (June 6, 1945 – November 10, 2008), also known as the Genesee River Killer, was an American serial killer active in Rochester, New York from 1972 through 1989.

Shawcross's first known murders took place in his hometown of Watertown, New York, where he killed a young boy and a girl. Under the terms of a plea bargain, he was allowed to plead guilty to one charge of manslaughter, for which he served 14 years of a 25-year sentence. Shawcross killed most of his victims in 1988 and 1989 after being granted an early parole, which later led to controversy. A food service worker, Shawcross trawled the streets of Rochester in his girlfriend's 1984 Dodge Omni (later using her 1987 Chevrolet Celebrity), looking for sex workers to kill.

Shawcross died on 10 November 2008, while serving a prison sentence of 250 years for his crimes, at the age of 63. Dr. Michael H. Stone, professor of psychiatry at Columbia University and an authority on violent behavior, identified Shawcross as "one of the most egregious examples of the unwarranted release of a prisoner" in his book The Anatomy of Evil.

Early life
Arthur John Shawcross was born in Kittery, Maine, the first of four children of Arthur Roy Shawcross and Elizabeth "Bessie" ("Betty") Yerakes Shawcross. His family moved to Watertown, New York, when he was young. While several later tests showed his intelligence to be sub-normal or even "borderline disabled," Shawcross received As and Bs in his first two years of grade school but was later tested to have an IQ of 86, signifying below-average intelligence.

Shawcross said throughout his childhood, he was a frequent bed-wetter (which is one part of the Macdonald triad). He later claimed his mother performed oral sex on him for several years starting when he was aged 7, and that during junior high school he had sexual relations with his sister. Shawcross had a reputation at school as a bully and would frequently act out violently. He dropped out of high school in 1960.

In April 1967, at age 21, Shawcross was drafted into United States Army. At this time he divorced his first wife and gave up his rights to their 18-month-old son, whom he never saw again. He served one tour of duty with the 4th Supply and Transport Company of the 4th Infantry Division in Vietnam. He later boasted of grotesque combat exploits, such as "beheading mama-sans and nailing their heads to trees as a warning to the Vietcong" and engaging in cannibalism; in reality he never served in a combat position.

After the war, Shawcross was stationed at Fort Sill in Lawton, Oklahoma, as an armorer. His second wife Linda experienced several aspects of his disturbing behavior, especially his penchant for starting fires; an Army psychiatrist told her that Shawcross derived sexual arousal from setting fires.

Return to New York
After his discharge from the Army, Shawcross moved with Linda from Oklahoma to Clayton, New York. Linda would soon divorce him, after which he began committing crimes such as arson and burglary. Shawcross's offenses earned him a five-year sentence at Attica Correctional Facility, and later Auburn Correctional Facility. After serving 22 months, he was granted an early release in October 1971, in part due to his role in the rescue of a correctional officer during a prison riot. Shawcross returned to his hometown of Watertown, New York, eventually getting a job with the Watertown Public Works Department and marrying for the third time.

On May 7, 1972, he raped and killed his first known victim, 10-year-old Jack Owen Blake, after luring the boy into a wooded area in Watertown. Blake's body was not found until authorities received a tip by telephone on September 5. On September 2, just prior to the body's discovery, Shawcross raped and killed eight-year-old Karen Ann Hill, who had been visiting Watertown with her mother for the Labor Day weekend. He was arrested the next day.

A grand jury indicted Shawcross for murder in Hill's death. On October 17, 1972, he was allowed to plead guilty to a lesser charge of first degree manslaughter for both deaths and was sentenced to an indeterminate term with a maximum of 25 years at Attica Correctional Facility. In November he was transferred to Green Haven Correctional Facility.

Jefferson County District Attorney William McClusky explained the plea bargain by stating that other than Shawcross's confession to police, there was no direct evidence linking him to the Blake killing. McClusky also suggested Shawcross could have argued at trial that he was under "extreme emotional disturbance," and a jury would have been likely to arrive at a verdict of manslaughter.

After fourteen years' imprisonment, inexperienced prison staff and social workers concluded that Shawcross was "no longer dangerous", disregarding the warnings of psychiatrists who had assessed Shawcross as a "schizoid psychopath." He was released on parole in April 1987.

Shawcross had difficulty settling down, as neighbors would protest his presence and employers would refuse to hire him. He first moved to Binghamton, New York, then relocated to Delhi with a girlfriend, Rose Marie Walley. When Delhi residents became aware of Shawcross' presence, the couple moved to nearby Fleischmanns, only to be met with hostility there as well. In late June 1987, Shawcross' parole officer moved him and Walley into a transient hotel in Rochester, but failed to notify local authorities of this action. In mid-October, Shawcross and Walley found more permanent lodgings at 241 Alexander Street in Rochester.

Second series of murders
In March 1988, Shawcross began murdering again, primarily targeting sex workers in the Rochester area, before his capture less than two years later. He was convicted of eleven murders, with a twelfth not officially ascribed to him. The victims were:
  

All the victims were murdered in Monroe County except for Gibson, who was killed in neighboring Wayne County. Retired detective Robert Keppel has argued that the detectives investigating the case over-relied on the concept of modus operandi, at times searching for multiple suspects due to small differences in the profiles of each victim.

On January 5, 1990, two days after June Cicero's body was discovered by aerial surveillance, police arrested Shawcross. He had been spotted by an eyewitness and a police surveillance team standing near his car, apparently urinating on a bridge over Salmon Creek near where Cicero's body had been dumped.

Trial and conviction
In November 1990, Shawcross was tried by Monroe County First Assistant District Attorney Charles J. Siragusa for the ten murders in Monroe County. He pleaded not guilty by reason of insanity, with testimony from forensic psychiatrist Dorothy Lewis that he had brain damage, multiple personality disorder (now known as dissociative identity disorder) and post-traumatic stress disorder, and had been sexually abused as a child. Lewis also claimed that Shawcross moved into a separate internal personality named "Bessie" when he killed, arguing for him to be institutionalized rather than being returned to the prisons system.

In response to the defense's claim that Shawcross's actions were the product of post-traumatic stress disorder resulting from his war service, FBI criminal profiler Robert K. Ressler reviewed the claim on behalf of the prosecution before the trial. Ressler wrote that "[Shawcross's] claim of having witnessed wartime atrocities was patently outrageous and untrue." Prosecution psychiatrist Dr. Park Dietz testified that Shawcross had antisocial personality disorder. It was later determined that Shawcross had a cyst pressing on the temporal lobe of his brain, as well as scarring on his frontal lobes  areas that are responsible for decision-making and self-control.

Imprisonment

Shawcross was held at the Sullivan Correctional Facility in Fallsburg, New York, where he was held until his death.

In 2003, Shawcross was interviewed by British reporter Katherine English for a documentary on cannibalism. He bragged about slicing out and eating the vulvae of three victims, but refused to discuss his earlier claim of eating the genitals of his first victim, Jack Blake.

Death
Officials said 63-year old Shawcross complained of a pain in his leg on the afternoon of November 10, 2008, his date of death. He was taken to Albany Medical Center where he went into cardiac arrest, and died shortly thereafter. He was pronounced dead at 9:50 p.m.

References

Sources

Norris, Joel. (1992) Arthur Shawcross: The Genesee River Killer, Pinnacle Books, 
Crime Library article on Arthur Shawcross

1945 births
2008 deaths
20th-century American criminals
American cannibals
American male criminals
American murderers of children
American people convicted of manslaughter
American people convicted of murder
American people who died in prison custody
American rapists
American serial killers
Crimes against sex workers in the United States
Criminals from New York (state)
Genesee River
Male serial killers
Necrophiles
People convicted of murder by New York (state)
People from Fallsburg, New York
People from Kittery, Maine
People from Watertown, New York
People with antisocial personality disorder
People with schizoid personality disorder
Prisoners sentenced to life imprisonment by New York (state)
Prisoners who died in New York (state) detention
Serial killers who died in prison custody
United States Army personnel of the Vietnam War
United States Army soldiers
Violence against women in the United States